Fergana Kipchak, also Kipchak Uzbek, is a recently extinct Kipchak Turkic language of the Kyrgyz-Kipchak branch formerly spoken in the Fergana Valley of Central Asia. In some districts of the Fergana Region, linguistic features of Fergana Kipchak are seen, especially in phonetics. These districts are Bagʻdod, Buvayda, Uchkoʻprik and parts of neighboring districts. Many idioms spoken in Uzbekistan that are now considered part of the Kyrgyz language are actually Fergana Kipchak. According to the E. D. Polivanov, the Fergana Kipchak language existed as a separate idiom as late as in the 1920s. According to A. N. Samoilovich, some descendants of Fergana Kipchak-speakers identify as a separate people from the Uzbeks, Kazakhs or Kyrgyz, although closely related to the latter.
Some dialects of Fergana Kipchak seem closely related to the Kipchak–Nogay languages.

See also
Kipchaks
Kipchak languages
Cumans
Cuman language

References

External links
 Особенности взаимного притяжения народов  (in Russian)
 Кыргызы  (in Russian)
 Кипчакский компонент в этногенезе киргизов  (in Russian)
 К вопросу о кыргызах и Фергане  (in Russian)
 Саяно-Алтай и Тянь-Шань  (in Russian)
 Кожом-Шукур (in Russian)
 Историографический обзор проблемы происхождения киргизов (in Russian)

Agglutinative languages
Turkic languages
Languages extinct in the 1920s
Extinct languages of Asia